The Lotus 24 was a Formula One racing car designed by Team Lotus for the 1962 Formula One season. Despite some early success in non-Championship Grands Prix, it was eclipsed by the technically superior Lotus 25 and rarely featured in the points in World Championship races.

Concept
Having devised the monocoque Lotus 25 for use by the works team, Colin Chapman decided to build a 'conventional' back-up spaceframe design which he would also sell to privateers. The 24 was a completely different design from its predecessor, the 21, and used much of the same suspension as the 25. Both Coventry Climax FWMV and BRM P56 engines were generally fitted, with at least one example running with the Coventry Climax FPF four-cylinder.

Racing history

The Lotus 24 made its debut at the 1962 Brussels Grand Prix. Jim Clark put it in pole position for the first heat, but retired after only one lap. Two weeks later Clark won the Lombank Trophy race at Snetterton. Its first World Championship event was the 1962 Dutch Grand Prix, where it finished second with Trevor Taylor. However, that would be its best Championship finish; the Lotus 25 had arrived on the scene and was obviously the way ahead, much to the chagrin of those who had paid good money for their 24. Colin Chapman had promised his customers that the team cars would be mechanically identical to the customer cars, leaving himself free to alter what he classified as the cars' "bodywork".

The 24 continued to be run by private teams in 1963 and 1964 with limited success, and by 1965 only one World Championship entry was made, Brian Gubby failing to qualify for the British Grand Prix.

World Championship results
(key) (results in bold indicate pole position; results in italics indicate fastest lap)

Notes

Bibliography

References

24